Cape Girardeau Commercial Historic District is a national historic district located at Cape Girardeau, Missouri. In a first increase, an 1891 contributing building at 101 North Main Street was added. The building was designed by Jerome B. Legg and Henry Ossenkop in Romanesque style. In a second increase, three contributing buildings dating from 1870 were added. The two increases added  each to the original listed area.

It was listed on the National Register of Historic Places in 2000 with boundary increases in 2007 and 2008.

References

Historic districts on the National Register of Historic Places in Missouri
Italianate architecture in Missouri
Romanesque Revival architecture in Missouri
Mission Revival architecture in Missouri
Geography of Cape Girardeau County, Missouri
Historic districts in Cape Girardeau County, Missouri
National Register of Historic Places in Cape Girardeau County, Missouri